Buduq is a village and municipality in Quba District of Azerbaijan. It has a population of 516.  The municipality consists of the villages of Budug, Dağüstü, and Zeyid.

References

External links

Budukh people
Populated places in Quba District (Azerbaijan)